Michael Iheonukara Okpara (25 December 1920 – 17 December 1984) was a Nigerian politician and Premier of Eastern Nigeria during the First Republic, from 1959 to 1966. At 39, he was the nation's youngest Premier. He was a strong advocate of what he called "pragmatic socialism" and believed that agricultural reform was crucial to the ultimate success of Nigeria.

Life
Michael Okpara, an Ohuhu-Igbo, was born on December 25, 1920, at Umuegwu Okpuala, Ohuhu, in the area of Umuahia, in the present-day Abia State of Nigeria. Although he was the son of a labourer, he was able to attend mission schools and later went to Uzuakoli Methodist College, where he won a scholarship to study medicine at Yaba Higher College, Lagos. Completing his medical studies at the Nigerian School of Medicine, he worked briefly as a government medical officer before returning to Umuahia to set up a private practice.

While involved in his practice, he developed an interest in the Zikist Movement (named after Nnamdi Azikiwe), a militant wing of the National Council of Nigeria and the Cameroons (NCNC). After rioting workers were shot by police at the Enugu coal mines in 1949, Okpara was arrested for his alleged complicity in inciting the riot, though he was soon released. After the granting of internal self-rule in 1952, he was elected into the Eastern Nigerian House of Assembly on the NCNC platform. Between 1952 and 1959 he held various Cabinet positions in Eastern Nigeria, ranging from Minister of Health to Minister of Agriculture and Production.

In 1953, when NCNC legislators revolted against the party leadership, he remained loyal and joined forces with Azikiwe. In November 1960, when Azikiwe left active politics to become Nigeria's first African Governor-General, Okpara was elected leader of the NCNC. His outspoken manner led to a severe strain in relations between his party and the ruling Northern People's Congress.

After independence
Okpara was the leader of the NCNC and Premier of Eastern Nigeria during the First Republic from 1959 to 1966. Although he was one of the politicians detained soon after the military coup of January, 1966, he survived the army revolt, in which the other two premiers were killed.

A strong advocate of what he termed "pragmatic socialism", he believed that Nigeria's salvation depended on a revolution in agriculture. To this end, he acquired and managed a large farm in his hometown, called Umuegwu Okpuala Mixed Farms, which inspired many Eastern Nigerian leaders to follow suit. He also championed the educational and infrastructural development of Eastern Nigeria.

He never owned a house of his own while he was in government. When the Nigerian Civil War ended, he went into exile in Ireland. Before his return from exile in 1979, his close associates and beneficiaries took up a collection to build him a house in his village, Umuegwu. Okpara died on 17 December 1984.

Legacy
He is a member of the Royal Academy of Physicians of Great Britain. Michael Okpara Way, in Abuja is named after him, as is the Michael Okpara University of Agriculture in Umudike, Okpara Square in Enugu;  Michael Okpara College of Agriculture in Imo State (since renamed the Imo State Polytechnic). He received the award of GCON (Grand Commander of the Order of the Niger), one of Nigeria's highest honours, in 1964. There is a statue of him in Enugu, Enugu State, and also another statue of him in Umuahia, the capital of the present day Abia State.

References

Portrait of a Leader by H. K. Offonry. New Africa Publishers (1983)
Power & Governance: The Legacy of Dr.Michael Okpara by the Michael Okpara Foundation (1997)

External links
 Profile at OnlineNigeria
 Nigeria Exchange - chronology of 1980s Nigeria history (source for birth/death dates)

1920 births
1984 deaths
People from Umuahia
Nigerian Christians
Igbo politicians
National Council of Nigeria and the Cameroons politicians
Premiers of Eastern Nigeria
Grand Commanders of the Order of the Niger
20th-century Nigerian politicians
Yaba Higher College alumni